Fluoran is a triarylmethane dye. It is the structural core of a variety of other dyes.

These dyes have a variety of applications such as chemical stains (for example eosins) and in thermal paper. Black 305 is a common leuco dye product for thermal paper.

References

Triarylmethane dyes
Spiro compounds
Lactones